Berguñu is one of 54 parishes in Cangas del Narcea, a municipality within the province and autonomous community of Asturias, in northern Spain.

Villages
Berguñu
Combarru
El Pládanu

References 

Parishes in Cangas del Narcea